"Ænema" is a song by rock band Tool, released as the third single from their second major-label release Ænima. Adam Jones made a video for the song using stop-motion animation; it is included in the Salival box set. The song reached number twenty-five on the US Mainstream Rock Tracks chart in August 1997.

The song makes extensive use of hemiola, a musical technique in which the emphasis in a triple meter is changed to give the illusion that both a duple and a triple meter occur in the song.

The song is cast in terminally climactic form, in which two verse/chorus pairs give way to a climactic ending on new material.

Lyrical references
Keenan incorporates into the lyrics part of comedian Bill Hicks' sketch "Goodbye You Lizard Scum" from his album Arizona Bay by stating the line "learn to swim, see you down in Arizona Bay." Hicks appears in the liner notes/sleeve as a doctor, and a lenticular image below the case tray illustrates a large portion of California disappearing leaving only the Pacific Ocean, as is mentioned in the song. California falling into the sea is a prediction made by Edgar Cayce, also known as "The Sleeping Prophet," about the end of days in which California and New York are to sink into the ocean among a plethora of other devastating weather changes.

In general, the song is a diatribe against celebrity culture, particularly around Los Angeles. This includes everything from the Church of Scientology (with the line "Fuck L. Ron Hubbard and fuck all his clones"), to possibly rappers ("gun-toting hip gangster wannabes"), to drug addicts, Hollywood executives and actresses whom Maynard views as corrupted and wishes would all be flushed down the proverbial toilet and/or possibly subsumed by the Jungian Anima referenced in the album title ("Mom please flush it all away").

Ultimately, the song calls for a kind of transformation, not a final misanthropic destruction.

Music video
Adam Jones directed the video for "Ænema" which features stop-motion animation with art design by Cam de Leon.  The video revolves around a humanoid figure with alien-like features. Throughout the video the character ventures through an aquatic room. A hose-like organ (resembling an umbilical cord) which squirts out water protrudes from its abdomen and fills the room in which the figure stands. At one point the figure starts to dress itself as images of embryos are shown briefly. Towards the end of the video a human character wearing a business suit tosses a water-filled box in which the figure is contained.

Track listing

Awards
Tool received the Grammy Award for Best Metal Performance for "Ænema", at the 40th Grammy Awards in 1998.

Charts

References 

Animated music videos
1996 songs
1997 singles
Grammy Award for Best Metal Performance
Songs about California
Songs about Los Angeles
Songs critical of religion
Songs written by Maynard James Keenan
Songs written by Danny Carey
Songs written by Paul D'Amour
Songs written by Adam Jones (musician)
Stop-motion animated music videos
Tool (band) songs
Zoo Entertainment (record label) singles